Antranig Dzarugian (Անդրանիկ Ծառուկեան; 1913 – 1989 in Paris) was an influential diasporan Armenian writer, poet, educator, and journalist in the 20th century.

Antranig Dzarugian (transliterated in Eastern Armenian as Andranik Tsarukian) was born in Gürün, Sivas Vilayet, Ottoman Empire in 1913. He was related to Chello Toros (1871–1893), one of the fighters of the Armenian irregular units against the Ottoman Empire. During the years of the Armenian genocide, Dzarugian separated from his mother as a result of the death marches in the Syrian desert and spent his childhood in the Armenian Orphanage of Aleppo. In 1921, he met his mother in Aleppo and moved to the local Haygazian Armenian School to receive his elementary education. In the same year, his father was arrested and killed in the Marash prison for his participation in the patriotic movement against the Ottoman Empire.

After completing his elementary schooling in Aleppo, Dzarugian moved to Beirut to complete his education at the newly opened Armenian College. Among his teachers in the college were prominent Armenian educators such as Nikol Aghbalian and Levon Shant. He became a dropout, and later started his career as a teacher in the Armenian schools of Aleppo and Beirut. He says that his writings are influenced by Siamanto and Daniel Varoujan.

Books and publications
He first published the Nayiri literary monthly in Aleppo (1945-1952), and afterwards he moved it to Beirut, where he published it as a literary, cultural and political weekly (1952-1983).

His first book Yegherapakhd Kertoghner (in Armenian Եղերաբախտ քերթողներ) was about Armenian poets and literary figures martyred during the Armenian genocide in Ottoman Turkey. This was followed by the novel Ashtray (in Armenian Մոխրաման). Among his most prominent works, "People Without Childhood" (in Armenian Մանկութիւն չունեցող մարդիկ, 1955) and "Ethereal Aleppo" (in Armenian Երազային Հալէպը, 1980) are autobiographical accounts dedicated to his childhood life in the orphanage of Aleppo. Also very famous is his Letter to Yerevan (in Armenian Թուղթ առ Երեւան). Dzarugian visited Soviet Armenia for the first time in 1956. His impressions of his frequent trips to the homeland were reflected in his books "Old Dreams, New Paths" (Հին երազներ, նոր ճամբաներ, 1958) and "New Armenia, New Armenians" (Նոր Հայաստան, նոր հայեր, 1983).

References

1913 births
1989 deaths
People from Gürün
People from Sivas vilayet
Armenians from the Ottoman Empire
Armenian educators
Armenian male poets
20th-century poets
20th-century Armenian poets
20th-century male writers
Lebanese magazine founders